Tarentel is a post-rock band which formed in San Francisco in 1995. Initially, the band consisted of Danny Grody and Jefre Cantu-Ledesma. The line-up altered over the years and has included John Hughes, Trevor Montgomery, Patricia Kavanaugh, Kenseth Thibideau, Jeffrey Rosenberg, Jim Redd, Tony Cross, Steve Dye and others.

Tarentel began as a post-rock band, making extended, LP-side length instrumental pieces. Over the course of three full-length albums and a number of singles and EPs, Tarentel has gradually shifted its style to a looser, more improvisational form that incorporates genres such as noise and drone as well as having a strong psychedelic element.

Tarentel member, Paul Clipson, projects original Super-8 film compositions that accompany each live performance by the band. He died in February 2018. The band has been inactive at least since their most recent release in 2009.

Discography

Studio albums
 From Bone to Satellite (1999) (limited to 1000 copies)
 The Order of Things (2001) (vinyl limited to 500 copies)
 Mort aux Vaches (2002) (limited to 1000 copies)
 We Move Through Weather (2004)

EPs
 Tarentel (1998)
 Travels in Constants vol. 3 (1999) (limited to 1000 copies) (part of the Travels in Constants series)
 When We Almost Killed Ourselves (1999) (limited to 200 copies)
 Looking for Things / Searching for Things (2000) (limited to 500 copies)
 Two Sides of Myself (2000) (limited to 500 copies)
 Carol Whiskey 9 (2000) (limited to 250 copies) (split with Rothko)
 Sets and Rises / Rises and Sets (2000) (limited to 500 copies) (split with Lilienthal)
 Fear of Bridges (2002) (limited. to 700 copies)
 Latency (2003) (limited to 100 copies)
 Paper White (2005)
 Big Black Square (2005)
 Ghost Weight (2005)
 Paper White / Big Black Square (2005)
 Home Ruckus (2005) (limited to 500 copies)
 Home Ruckus: Double-Sided Air (2007) (limited to 500 copies)
 Home Ruckus: Bottled Smoke (2007) (limited to 100 copies)
 Ghetto Beats On the Surface of the Sun (2007)
 You Can't Hide Your Love Forever Vol. 3: Space Junk (2009) (limited to 300 copies, part of the You Can't Hide Your Love Forever 7-inch subscription series)

Compilations
 Ephemera | Singles 99-00 (2002)

Live albums
 Live Edits: Natoma CD (2006) (limited to 500 copies)
 Ghetto Beats On the Surface of the Sun (2006) (limited to 500 copies of each)
 Live Edits: Italy & Switzerland (2008) (limited to 500 copies)

DVDs
 Over Water (2009) (DVD-r collaboration with filmmaker Paul Clipson, three shorts of Super8 film and music mostly culled from live performances in Italy & Switzerland in 2005, limited to 100 copies)

References

External links

American post-rock groups
Temporary Residence Limited artists
Musical groups from San Francisco